The Tennessee Open is the Tennessee state open golf tournament, open to both amateur and professional golfers. It is organized by the Tennessee Golf Association. It has been played annually since 1949 at a variety of courses around the state.

Winners

2022 Brad Hawkins
2021 Nolan Ray
2020 No tournament due to COVID-19 pandemic
2019 Hunter Green
2018 Joey Savoie (amateur)
2017 Jonathan Hodge
2016 Jason Millard
2015 Garrett Willis
2014 Steven Fox
2013 Garrett Willis
2012 Craig Smith (amateur)
2011 Jonathan Fly (amateur)
2010 Grant Leaver
2009 Bryce Ledford
2008 Codie Hale (amateur)
2007 Derek Rende (amateur)
2006 Justin Metzger
2005 Andrew Pratt
2004 Andrew Pratt (amateur)
2003 Rob Long (amateur)
2002 Tim Jackson (amateur)
2001 Trey Lewis (amateur)
2000 Garrett Willis
1999 Loren Roberts
1998 Richard Smith (amateur)
1997 Kip Henley
1996 Walt Chapman
1995 Jared Melson
1994 Chuck Jabaley (amateur)
1993 Jimmy Ellis
1992 Bobby Nichols 
1991 Steve Munson
1990 Gibby Gilbert
1989 Gibby Gilbert
1988 Gibby Gilbert
1987 Rob Long (amateur)
1986 Gibby Gilbert
1985 Mike Nelms
1984 Gary Robinson
1983 Bob Wolcott (amateur)
1982 Kip Henley (amateur)
1981 Mike Nelms
1980 Bill Argabrite (amateur)
1979 Jimmy Paschal
1978 Sam Young (amateur)
1977 Richard Eller
1976 Larry White
1975 Greg Powers
1974 Bobby Bray
1973 Joe Campbell
1972 Mason Rudolph
1971 Richard Eller
1970 Larry Gilbert
1969 Harold Lane (amateur)
1968 Bobby Greenwood (amateur)
1967 John Deal (amateur)
1966 Mason Rudolph
1965 Joe Campbell
1964 Mason Rudolph
1963 Mason Rudolph
1962 Pat Abbott
1961 J. C. Goosie
1960 J. C. Goosie
1959 Mason Rudolph
1958 Joe Campbell
1957 Curtis Person, Sr. (amateur)
1956 Mason Rudolph (amateur)
1955 Pat Abbott
1954 Pat Abbott
1953 Curtis Person, Sr. (amateur)
1952 Albert Stone, Jr. (amateur)
1951 Ira Templeton (amateur)
1950 Johnny Morris
1949 Pat Abbott

Earlier events
1921 Frank Sprogell

References

External links

Tennessee Golf Association

Golf in Tennessee
State Open golf tournaments
1949 establishments in Tennessee
Recurring sporting events established in 1949